Acromyrmex biscutatus is a species of leaf-cutter ant, a New World ant of the subfamily Myrmicinae of the genus Acromyrmex.

Synonyms 
Formica biscutata Fabricius

See also
List of leafcutter ants

References

Acromyrmex
Insects described in 1775
Taxa named by Johan Christian Fabricius